Herbert Niemann (12 December 1935 – 19 February 1991) was an East German judoka. He competed in the men's heavyweight event at the 1964 Summer Olympics. He married Margarete Selling who had won gold with the women's eight at the 1966 European Rowing Championships. Niemann committed suicide in Hellersdorf (Berlin) in 1991.

References

External links
 

1935 births
1991 suicides
People from Bernburg
People from the Free State of Anhalt
German male judoka
Olympic judoka of the United Team of Germany
Judoka at the 1964 Summer Olympics
Suicides in Germany
Sportspeople from Saxony-Anhalt
20th-century German people